Cyril Hollinshead (26 May 1902 – 25 November 1995) was an English cricketer. Hollinshead was a left-handed batsman who bowled left-arm fast-medium.  He was born at Timberland, Lincolnshire.

In 1931, Hollinshead played a single Minor Counties Championship match for Lincolnshire against Bedfordshire.  Fifteen years later, following the Second World War, he played a single first-class match for Gloucestershire against Cambridge University at the Wagon Works Ground in Gloucester.  In his only first-class match he wasn't required to bat and bowled 5 wicketless overs.  In 1947, he represented the Gloucestershire Second XI in a Minor Counties Championship match against the Surrey Second XI at The Oval.

Hollinshead died at Cheltenham, Gloucestershire on 25 November 1995.

References

External links
Cyril Hollinshead at Cricinfo
Cyril Hollinshead at CricketArchive

1902 births
1995 deaths
People from North Kesteven District
English cricketers
Lincolnshire cricketers
Gloucestershire cricketers